Henry Hoff may refer to:

Henry K. Hoff (1809–1878), United States Navy officer
Henry Olaf Hoff (1925–2011), Norwegian politician